Yakovlev Yak-50 may refer to:

Yakovlev Yak-50 (1949), a Soviet experimental turbojet interceptor aircraft
Yakovlev Yak-50 (1975), a Soviet propeller-driven aerobatic and trainer aircraft